The Pitchfork Music Festival Paris 2011 was the first edition of the music festival. It was held on 28 to 29 October 2011 at the Grande halle de la Villette, Paris, France. The festival was headlined by Aphex Twin and Bon Iver, the second day lineup was also curated by the latter.

Lineup
Headline performers are listed in boldface. Artists listed from latest to earliest set times.

The pre- and post-parties were held on 27 and 29 October 2011 at the Point Éphémère.

Notes

References

External links

Pitchfork Music Festival
2011 music festivals